The modest ground skink (Scincella modesta)  is a species of skink found in China.

References

Scincella
Reptiles described in 1864
Taxa named by Albert Günther